Atta opaciceps is a species of leaf-cutter ant, a New World ant of the subfamily Myrmicinae of the genus Atta.

See also
List of leafcutter ants

References

Atta (genus)
Insects described in 1839